Taylor Johnson was a professional rugby league footballer who played in the 1920s. He played at club level for Featherstone Rovers (Heritage № 32).

Club career
Taylor Johnson made his début for Featherstone Rovers on Saturday 11 February 1922.

References

External links

Search for "Johnson" at rugbyleagueproject.org

English rugby league players
Featherstone Rovers players
Place of birth missing
Place of death missing
Year of birth missing
Year of death missing